Phillipos Monotropos or Philippus Solitarius ("Phillip the Recluse"; ;   1080) was a Byzantine monk and writer, notable for his authorship of the Dioptra ("The Mirror"), written towards the end of the eleventh century.

Philip probably lived on Mount Athos. The 5-volume Dioptra is a compendium of prose and verse for the education of the next generation. In the first volume a sinful monk repents to his soul. In the four following volumes a dialogue continues between body and soul.

References

11th-century Byzantine people
Byzantine theologians
Eastern Orthodox monks
Byzantine writers
11th-century Byzantine writers
11th-century Byzantine monks
11th-century Christian theologians
People associated with Mount Athos